(contemporarily written as 延寳) is the  after Kanbun and before Tenna. This period spanned the years from September 1673 to September 1681.

Change of era
 1673 : The new era of Enpō (meaning "Prolonged Wealth") was created to mark a number of disasters, including a great fire in Kyōto. The previous era ended and a new one commenced in Kanbun 14, on the ninth day of the 13th month.

Events of the Enpō era
 1673 (Enpō 1): There was a great fire in Heian-kyō.
 1673 (Enpō 1): The foundations for Mitsui financial success began with the opening of a dry good store in Edo.
 May 10, 1674 (Enpō 2, 5th day of the 4th month): Ingen Ryūki, founder of the Ōbaku sect of Japanese Zen Buddhism, died at Manpuku-ji, a Buddhist temple which Ingen had founded at Uji, near Heian-kyō.
 1675 (Enpō 3): A devastating fire burned Heian-kyō.
 1675 (Enpō 3): The Bonin Islands (Ogasawara Islands) are explored by shogunate expedition, following up "discovery" of the islands by the Japanese when a ship bound for Edo from Kyūshū is blown off course by a storm in Kanbun 10. The islands are claimed as a territory of Japan.
 April 7, 1680 (Enpō 8, 8th day of the 3rd month) : Tokugawa Ietsuna, the 4th shōgun of the Edo bakufu died; and his named successor, Tokugawa Tsunayoshi, was ready to take his place as the 5th Tokugawa shōgun.

Notes

References
 Hall, John Whitney. (1970). Japan: From Prehistory to Modern Times in Delacorte World History, Vol. XX. New York: Delacorte Press. 
 Nussbaum, Louis-Frédéric and Käthe Roth. (2005).  Japan encyclopedia. Cambridge: Harvard University Press. ;  OCLC 58053128
 Screech, Timon. (2006). Secret Memoirs of the Shoguns: Isaac Titsingh and Japan, 1779–1822. London: RoutledgeCurzon. ; OCLC 65177072
 Tanaka, Hiroyuki. (1993). "The Ogasawara Islands in Tokugawa Japan", Kaiji Shi Kenkyuu (Journal of the Maritime History). No. 50, June, 1993, Tokyo: The Japan Society of the History of Maritime.... Click link to digitized, full-text copy of this monograph (in English)
 Titsingh, Isaac. (1834). Nihon Ōdai Ichiran; ou,  Annales des empereurs du Japon.  Paris: Royal Asiatic Society, Oriental Translation Fund of Great Britain and Ireland. OCLC 5850691.

External links 
 National Diet Library, "The Japanese Calendar" -- historical overview plus illustrative images from library's collection

Japanese eras
1670s in Japan
1680s in Japan